Qaemiyeh-ye Do (also Romanized as Qā’emīyeh-ye Do; also known as Kāmiāb and Qā’emīyeh) is a village in Azadegan Rural District, in the Central District of Rafsanjan County, Kerman Province, Iran. At the 2006 census, its population was 188, in 43 families.

References 

Populated places in Rafsanjan County